|}

The Strensall Stakes is a Group 3 flat horse race in Great Britain open to horses aged three years or older. It is run at York over a distance of 1 mile and 177 yards (1,771 metres), and it is scheduled to take place each year in August.

History
The event is named after Strensall, a village located several miles to the north of York. It was formerly restricted to fillies, and it used to be contested over 7 furlongs. For a period it was classed at Listed level, and it was usually staged in early September.

The race was opened to male horses and extended to its present distance in 1987. It was promoted to Group 3 status in 2003.

The Strensall Stakes became part of the Ebor Festival in 2008, but that year's running was abandoned because of a waterlogged course. It now takes place on the final day of the meeting, which is held over four days in mid August.

Records
Most successful horse since 1986 (2 wins):
 Echo of Light – 2006, 2007

Leading jockey since 1986 (8 wins):
 Frankie Dettori – Shaima (1991), Lower Egypt (1994), Triarius (1995), Naheef (2003), Echo of Light (2006, 2007), Rio de la Plata (2010), Dubai Prince (2012)

Leading trainer since 1986 (6 wins):
 Saeed bin Suroor – Triarius (1995), Naheef (2003), Echo of Light (2006, 2007), Rio de la Plata (2010), Real World (2021)

Winners since 1986

 The 2008 running was abandoned because of a waterlogged course.

Earlier winners

 1967: Royal Saint
 1968: Kursaal
 1971: Magic Flute
 1972: Pearl Star
 1974: Flashy
 1975: Joking Apart
 1976: Sauceboat
 1978: Spring in Deepsea
 1979: Petty Purse
 1980: Luck of the Draw
 1982: Triple Tipple
 1984: Capricorn Belle
 1985: Raabihah

See also
 Horse racing in Great Britain
 List of British flat horse races

References
 Paris-Turf: 
 Racing Post:

 galopp-sieger.de – Strensall Stakes.
 horseracingintfed.com – International Federation of Horseracing Authorities – Strensall Stakes (2018).
 pedigreequery.com – Strensall Stakes – York.

Flat races in Great Britain
York Racecourse
Open mile category horse races